The 2022 Oregon gubernatorial election took place on November 8, 2022, to elect the governor of Oregon. The incumbent governor, Democrat Kate Brown, took office on February 18, 2015, upon the resignation of John Kitzhaber. She was subsequently elected in the gubernatorial special election in 2016, and was re-elected to a full term in 2018. Due to term limits, she was ineligible for re-election in 2022.

The Oregonian anticipated the election to have "the first competitive Democratic primary in more than a decade and potentially the closest such race since 2002." Willamette Week anticipated a "wide open field of Democrats", citing the lack of an incumbent. Almost 20 Republican Party candidates ran for the office, including two previous nominees for governor in 1998 and 2016, as well as 15 Democrats and some non-affiliates/third-party members.

In the May 17 primary elections, former Oregon House Speaker Tina Kotek was declared the winner of the Democratic primary half an hour after the ballot deadline. The next day, former House Minority Leader Christine Drazan was determined to have won the Republican primary. Notably, the general election featured three prominent female candidates, including former state senator Betsy Johnson, who was a moderate Democrat, running as an independent.

Oregon was considered a possible Republican pickup, as Brown had the lowest approval rating of any governor in the United States at the time and Johnson could have siphoned votes from Kotek. Nonetheless, Kotek won the election by a slim margin, becoming Oregon's 7th consecutive Democratic governor. She became one of the first lesbian governors in the United States, along with Maura Healey in Massachusetts.

Democratic primary

Candidates

Nominee 

 Tina Kotek, former speaker of the Oregon House of Representatives (2013–2022)

Eliminated in primary 

David Beem, former member of the Oregon Disabilities Commission
Julian Bell, critical care and pulmonary medicine specialist and candidate for governor in 2016
Wilson Bright, retired textile company operator
George Carrillo, program manager at the Oregon Health Authority and Marine Corps veteran
Michael Cross, software designer, commercial driver, and Republican nominee for Oregon attorney general in 2020
Ifeanyichukwu Diru, farmer and candidate for governor in 2014
Peter Hall, Haines city councilor and member of the Board of Directors of the League of Oregon Cities
Keisha Merchant, artist and creative designer
Tobias Read, Oregon state treasurer (endorsed Tina Kotek in the general election)
Patrick Starnes, former Independent Party of Oregon candidate for governor (2018)
David Stauffer, environmental inventor and perennial candidate
John Sweeney, owner of Canary Castle Gallery
Michael Trimble, cyclist and disability advocate
Genevieve Wilson, independent contractor

Disqualified
Nicholas Kristof, author and Pulitzer Prize-winning journalist at The New York Times (found to not meet residency requirements by the Secretary of State's office and Oregon Supreme Court) (endorsed Tina Kotek in the general election)

Withdrawn 
 Casey Kulla, Yamhill County commissioner (running for labor commissioner)
 David Lavinsky, businessman
 Nico Pucci, Oregon Health Authority operations and policy analyst
 Peter Winter, non-profit project manager

Declined
 Rukaiyah Adams, chief investment officer of the Meyer Memorial Trust
Julia Brim-Edwards, member of the Portland Public School Board
 Shemia Fagan, Oregon secretary of state
Val Hoyle, Oregon labor commissioner (running for the U.S. House)
Deborah Kafoury, chair of the Multnomah County Commission and former state representative from the 18th and 43rd districts (endorsed Tina Kotek)
Lynn Peterson, president of the Portland Metro Council (endorsed Tina Kotek)
Ellen Rosenblum, Oregon attorney general (endorsed Tina Kotek in the general election)
Melissa Unger, executive director of Service Employees International Union Oregon chapter
Ted Wheeler, mayor of Portland and former Oregon state treasurer

Debates

Endorsements

Polling

Results

Republican primary

Candidates

Nominee
Christine Drazan, former minority leader of the Oregon House of Representatives (2019–2021) and state representative from the 39th district (2019–2022)

Eliminated in primary 
 Raymond Baldwin, general contractor
 Bridget Barton, political consultant for Third Century Solutions (endorsed Betsy Johnson in the General Election)
 Court Boice, Curry County chair (endorsed Christine Drazan in the general election)
David Burch
Jessica Gomez, member of the Business Oregon Commission and Oregon Institute of Technology Board of Trustees
Nick Hess, CEO & entrepreneur
Tim McCloud, business development analyst
 Kerry McQuisten, mayor of Baker City
Brandon Merritt, business development manager
 Bud Pierce, oncologist and nominee for governor in 2016 (endorsed Christine Drazan in the general election)
 John Presco, president of Royal Rosamond Press
Stan Pulliam, mayor of Sandy (endorsed Christine Drazan in the general election)
Amber Richardson, chiropractor
 Bill Sizemore, general contractor, tax-reduction advocate, candidate for governor in 2010, and nominee in 1998
Stefan Galen Strek (Stregoi), painter and graphic design artist
Marc Thielman, former Alsea School District superintendent
Bob Tiernan, former state representative from the 24th district (1993–1997) and former chair of the Oregon Republican Party (2009–2011)

Withdrawn 
 Angelique Bouvier, psychologist and business owner
Reed Christensen, former electrical engineer
 Mark Duncan, fight instructor
 John L. Fosdick III, customer service representative, Army veteran
 Darin Harbick, businessman (running for U.S. Senate)
 Jim Huggins, film producer, businessman and Air Force veteran (endorsed Kerry McQuisten)
 Alexander Males, polyurethane manufacturing worker
 Monte Sauer Jr., CEO of AmericaProud

Declined
 Knute Buehler, former state representative from the 54th district (2015–2019), nominee for Secretary of State in 2012, and nominee for governor in 2018 (endorsed Betsy Johnson)
Dallas Heard, state senator from the 1st district and former chair of the Oregon Republican Party (endorsed Christine Drazan in the general election)
 Tim Knopp, minority leader of the Oregon Senate from the 27th district
 Dennis Linthicum, state senator from the 28th district (endorsed Christine Drazan in the general election)
 Julie Parrish, former state representative from the 37th district (2011–2019)
 Bill Post, former state representative from the 25th district (2015–2021) (ineligible due to out-of-state residency)
 Tootie Smith, Clackamas County chair and former state representative from the 18th and 28th districts (2001–2003) (endorsed Christine Drazan in the general election)

Debates

Endorsements

Polling

Results

Independents and other parties

Candidates

Candidates for general election 
R. Leon Noble (Libertarian Party)
Donice Noelle Smith, Army veteran and talk show host (Constitution Party)
 Betsy Johnson, former Democratic state senator from Oregon's 16th Senate district (non-affiliated)

Withdrawn 
 Nathalie Paravicini, naturopathic doctor (Pacific Green Party and Oregon Progressive Party) (endorsed Kotek)

Failed to qualify for general election 
In order to be listed as candidates on the general election ballot, non-affiliated candidates for governor needed to collect 23,744 signatures from Oregon voters (1% of votes cast for president in the 2020 election).
 Tim Harrold, security expert (non-affiliated)
Dustin Watkins, dishwasher (non-affiliated)

Not nominated 
Kevin Levy, real estate broker (Independent Party)
Paul Romero, refrigeration repair technician, Republican candidate for Oregon's 2nd congressional district in 2016 and 2018, and Republican candidate for U.S. Senate in 2020 (Constitution Party)

General election

Predictions

Debates

Endorsements

Polling
Aggregate polls

Graphical summary

Tina Kotek vs. Christine Drazan

Generic Democrat vs. generic Republican vs. Betsy Johnson

Generic Democrat vs. generic Republican

Generic Democrat vs. generic Republican vs. generic independent

Results

See also 
 2022 Oregon state elections
 2022 United States gubernatorial elections

Notes

Partisan clients

References

External links
Official campaign websites
 Christine Drazan (R) for Governor
 Betsy Johnson (I) for Governor
 Tina Kotek (D) for Governor
 R. Leon Noble (L) for Governor
 Donice Noelle Smith (C) for Governor

2022 Oregon elections
2022
Oregon